John Selby Spence (May 19, 1909 – March 7, 1973) was a prelate of the Roman Catholic Church.  He served as titular bishop of Aggersel and auxiliary bishop of the Archdiocese of Washington D.C. from 1964 until his death in 1973.

Biography

Early life 
John Spence was born in Baltimore, Maryland on May 19, 1909.  He attended St. Mary’s Seminary in Baltimore, then went to the Pontifical North American College in Rome.

Priesthood 
Spence was ordained in Rome by Cardinal Francesco Marchetti Selvaggiani to the priesthood on December 5, 1933, for the Archdiocese of Baltimore. Spence was incardinated, or transferred, to the new Archdiocese of Washington when it split from Baltimore.  Spence also served as the archdiocesan director of education in 1948.  As such, he was tasked by the archbishop with ending racial segregation at all of the archdiocesan schools.   Spence was also the founding pastor of St. John the Baptist Parish in Chillum, Maryland, in 1951 and pastor of the Shrine of the Sacred Heart Parish in Washington in 1958.

Spence served as coordinator for the archdiocese for its participation in the 1963 March on Washington, in which Dr. Martin Luther King Jr. gave his famous "I have a dream" speech.

Auxiliary Bishop of Washington 
On March 17, 1964, Pope Paul VI appointed Spence as an auxiliary bishop of the Archdiocese of Washington and as titular bishop of Aggersel; he was consecrated by Cardinal Egidio Vagnozzi on May 19, 1964.  He remained pastor at Sacred Heart Parish.

John Spence died in Washington on March 7, 1973, at age 63.

References

1909 births
1973 deaths
Religious leaders from Baltimore
20th-century Roman Catholic bishops in the United States